En Kadhal Solla (English: To express my love...) is a song from the 2010 Tamil feature film Paiyaa, composed and performed by Yuvan Shankar Raja. The song, with lyrics by Na. Muthukumar, was released as part of the soundtrack album of the film on 12 February 2010. The lover sings desperately to himself unable to express his love, the video is picturized on the lead actors Karthi and Tamanna. The song was a very popular chartbuster, which stayed in the charts up to 10 months, and in the Radio Mirchi charts even one year after its release. The song played a substantial role in the film's success as did other songs from the album. The songs' tune was later taken by Bangladeshi composer Arfin Rumey who used it as the theme song, "Jole Utho", for the Bangladesh national cricket team.

Background
Director N. Linguswamy at an awards ceremony in May 2011 disclosed that the song was not originally composed for Paiyaa. When composing the songs for this film, Yuvan Shankar Raja disclosed that he also had composed some numbers for a private album, one of them was this song. Linguswamy listened to the song and was so impressed by it that he immediately requested Yuvan to give him the song for the film.

Awards

References

2009 songs
Indian songs
Songs written for films
Songs with music by Yuvan Shankar Raja
Yuvan Shankar Raja songs
Tamil-language songs
Tamil film songs
Songs with lyrics by Na. Muthukumar